John Wynne ( – 9 February 1747) was an Irish  politician.

He sat in the House of Commons of Ireland from 1727 to 1747 as a Member of Parliament for Castlebar.

References 
 

1690 births
Year of birth uncertain
1747 deaths
Irish MPs 1727–1760
Members of the Parliament of Ireland (pre-1801) for County Mayo constituencies